Carlos Abella y Ramallo (13 April 1934 – 12 August 2014) was a Spanish diplomat whose career with the Ministry of Foreign Affairs spanned forty years until his retirement in 2004.

Abella died on 12 August 2014, at the age of 80.

References

1934 births
2014 deaths
Ambassadors of Spain to the Holy See
Ambassadors of Spain to Kenya